Beny Wahyudi (can also be spelled as Benny Wahyudi, born 20 March 1986) is an Indonesian professional footballer who plays as a full-back for Liga 2 club Deltras.

Career 
Beny have been playing with the national squad since 2010. Shortly after another failure for the Indonesian team to win the 2016 AFF Championship, Beny, together with Boaz Solossa announced their intention for retirement from the national squad, citing due to the failure as well for their age factor. However, Boaz still disclosed his intention to retire, saying he want to discuss the matter with his family first while celebrating Christmas in his hometown of Sorong. Beny officially retired from the national team on 29 December 2016.

Career statistics

International

Honours

Club honors
Arema 
 Indonesia Super League: 2009–10
 East Java Governor Cup: 2013
 Menpora Cup: 2013
 Indonesian Inter Island Cup: 2014/15
 Indonesia President's Cup: 2017

PSM Makassar
 Piala Indonesia: 2019

Country honours
Indonesia
AFF Championship runner-up: 2010, 2016

References

External links
 

1986 births
Living people
Indonesian Muslims
Javanese people
Sportspeople from Malang
Association football defenders
Indonesian footballers
Indonesia international footballers
Indonesian Premier Division players
Liga 1 (Indonesia) players
Liga 2 (Indonesia) players
Persekabpas Pasuruan players
Persekam Metro players
Persewangi Banyuwangi players
Deltras F.C. players
Arema F.C. players
Madura United F.C. players
PSM Makassar players
PSIM Yogyakarta players
PSIS Semarang players